This is a list of electoral results for the Electoral district of Croydon in Victoria (Australia) state elections.

Members for Croydon

Election results

Elections in the 2020s

Elections in the 2010s

References

Victoria (Australia) state electoral results by district